Gamizaj-e Olya (also Romanized as Gāmīzaj-e ‘Olya and Gāmīzej-e ‘Olyā; also known as Gāmizaj, Gāmīzaj-e Bālā, Gamīzej-e Bālā, and Garmizak) is a village in Sar Firuzabad Rural District, Firuzabad District, Kermanshah County, Kermanshah Province, Iran. At the 2006 census, its population was 275, in 48 families.

References 

Populated places in Kermanshah County